Black Mountain News is  a weekly newspaper based in Black Mountain, North Carolina. The paper was founded in 1945 by James Clarence Cornelius and his brother-in-law, John Ealy, from Indianapolis, Indiana and was later purchased by Gordon Greenwood.

History
In 1995, the Black Mountain News was purchased by Multimedia. Later that year, Multimedia was acquired by Gannett.

The newspaper won several awards from the North Carolina Press Association in 2016 including first place in general news reporting and profile feature, and additional awards for video and community coverage.

See also
 List of newspapers published in North Carolina

References

External links

Weekly newspapers published in North Carolina
Buncombe County, North Carolina